Milton Cuyler, Jr. (born October 7, 1968) is a former major league outfielder drafted by the Detroit Tigers in the second round of the  amateur draft. He finished third behind Juan Guzman and winner Chuck Knoblauch for the  American League Rookie of the Year award.

Early life
Cuyler graduated from Southwest High School in Macon, Georgia.  He was drafted by the Detroit Tigers in the second round, 46th overall, of the 1986 Major League Baseball draft.  Also a standout football player, Cuyler had signed a letter of intent to play college football at Florida State, where he would've joined Deion Sanders as the top incoming defensive backs.  He opted to play baseball full time when the Tigers offered a $75,000 signing bonus, although FSU defensive coordinator Mickey Andrews left open the opportunity to return to football.

Cuyler was considered among the Tigers best prospects for four consecutive years by Baseball America, ranking 5th in 1988, 4th in 1989, 5th in 1990, and 3rd in 1991.
1988 Florida State League

Professional baseball career
Cuyler made his major league debut with the Detroit Tigers on September 6, 1990 at the age of 21 as a defensive replacement in right field for John Shelby.  He saw consistent playing time in centerfield and batting ninth to close out the 1990 season, with Lloyd Moseby moving from center to leftfield.

Cuyler was named the Detroit Tigers Rookie of the Year in 1991, and finished 3rd overall in American League Rookie of the Year voting behind winner Chuck Knoblauch and runner-up Juan Guzman.

After failing to live up to his early promise, he was released by the Tigers following the  season. He signed with the Montreal Expos following the season, but failed to make the team that spring. He appeared in seven games for the Texas Rangers in September , and spent the  season in their minor league system before calling it a career. In 490 games from 1990–1998, Cuyler tallied 329 hits, 10 home runs and 119 runs batted in with a .237 career average.

Following his playing career, Cuyler served as the hitting coach for the Gulf Coast League Twins until 2013.

In 2011, Cuyler was named to the Macon, Georgia Sports Hall of Fame.

References

External links

Milt Cuyler at Baseball Almanac

1968 births
Living people
African-American baseball players
American expatriate baseball players in Canada
Baseball players from Georgia (U.S. state)
Boston Red Sox players
Bristol Tigers players
Detroit Tigers players
Fayetteville Generals players
Lakeland Tigers players
London Tigers players
Major League Baseball center fielders
Nashua Pride players
Oklahoma RedHawks players
Texas Rangers players
Toledo Mud Hens players
Tulsa Drillers players
21st-century African-American people
20th-century African-American sportspeople